Financial data processors are the next layer in the service chain between users of financial data and financial data vendors. Most data is now delivered as bits and bytes and not in a physical format. Data is fed through web pages and as "raw" data files. Files are either processed by banks or by third-party companies – financial data processors who provide additional added value to those companies who choose to use them.

Services offered 

Pricing validation 
Price validation services enable users to streamline their operations and reduce the risks inherent in activities such as NAV production.  Acting as a managed service provider, a financial data processor will take raw data from the clients' chosen data sources and subject it to the processor's validation routines before onward delivery.

Counterparty Price Collection and Validation 
A Counterparty Collection service provides a unique collection, reconciliation and validation service for OTC derivatives and other illiquid instruments.  

Corporate Actions/Dividends Validation 
A corporate actions service enables users to streamline their operations and reduce the risks inherent in fund administration.  The financial Data Processor will act as a managed service provider, and take raw data from the clients' chosen data sources and subject it to the processor's validation routines before onward delivery.

Added value
Working with an end user, a financial data processor can process raw data feeds or services to help a user achieve:

 Reduction of operational risk. 
 Validation of hard to price instruments.
 Reduced chance of a breach of Service Level Agreements.
 Clearly defined audit trail.

List of processors
 Adaptive Modeler
 CQG
 Esignal
 MetaStock
 Money.Net
 MetaTrader 4
 TradeStation

Financial services organizations